The 2014 South Carolina State Bulldogs football team represented South Carolina State University in the 2014 NCAA Division I FCS football season. They were led by 13th-year head coach Oliver Pough and played their home games at Oliver C. Dawson Stadium. They were a member of the Mid-Eastern Athletic Conference. They finished the season 8–4, 6–2 in MEAC play to finish in a five-way tie for the MEAC championship. However, they did not earn the conference's automatic bid to the FCS playoffs and did not receive an at-large bid.

Schedule

Source: Schedule

References

South Carolina State
South Carolina State Bulldogs football seasons
Mid-Eastern Athletic Conference football champion seasons
South Carolina State Bulldogs football